Fabrizio Romondini (born 24 April 1977) is an Italian former professional footballer who last played for Pergocrema.

Career 
He formerly played for AS Roma, Albacete, Pistoiese, Giugliano, Padova, Salernitana, Cavese, Venezia and Spezia.

His move to Albacete was part of the transfer of Iván Helguera to Roma.

On 28 January 2009, Romondini terminated his contract with Avellino of the Italian Serie B, and signed a contract with  Olympiakos Volos which ran until June 2010.

References

1977 births
Living people
Italian footballers
Serie A players
A.S. Roma players
Italian expatriate footballers
Expatriate footballers in Spain
Expatriate footballers in Greece
Albacete Balompié players
U.S. Pistoiese 1921 players
Calcio Padova players
U.S. Salernitana 1919 players
Venezia F.C. players
Spezia Calcio players
U.S. Avellino 1912 players
Olympiacos Volos F.C. players
Atletico Roma F.C. players
S.S.C. Giugliano players
Italian expatriate sportspeople in Greece
Italian expatriate sportspeople in Spain
Association football midfielders